William Burke Wood (b. Montreal, Quebec, Canada, 26 May 1779; d. Philadelphia, 23 September 1861) was an American theatre manager and actor. He was brought as a child to New York City, where he began life as a clerk. Feeling that he had a vocation for the stage, he set out for Annapolis, Maryland, with a capital of three doubloons, and through the courtesy of Manager Wignell, an old family friend, he made his first appearance there on 26 June 1798 as George Barnwell. He was partially successful, and began an engagement the same year in Philadelphia in Secrets Worth Knowing.

On 30 January 1804, he married Juliana Westray (1778 - 1838), a British-born actress. She had joined the company in which Wood was playing, and after her marriage continued to act in the theatres that he managed. The couple had a son, William Wightman Wood, who became a journalist and author based in Macau and Canton, China.

In the autumn of 1809, Wood purchased of William Warren one half of his interest in the Philadelphia, Baltimore, and Washington theatres. Previous to entering upon the duties of management he visited New York City and played De Valmont.

In the autumn of 1810, he began his career as manager in Baltimore, Maryland, and from September 1812 till the close of the season of 1820, he divided his time between that city and Philadelphia, where his company played at the Chestnut Street Theatre. On 2 April 1820, the latter edifice was destroyed by fire, and, as the insurance had expired a few days before, the loss was heavy. Having secured a lease of the Walnut Street Theatre, the Warren-Wood company began to play again in Philadelphia the following November. On the 27th of that month Master Edwin Forrest made his first appearance there on any stage in Douglas. The Chestnut Street Theatre having been rebuilt, it was opened by the same managers on 2 December 1822 with the School for Scandal, Warren playing Sir Peter Teazle, and Wood, Charles Surface.

In 1826 the sixteen years' partnership between the two managers was terminated by the withdrawal of Mr. Wood. On 1 October 1828, the latter undertook the management of the Arch Street Theatre, Philadelphia, then just built; but the enterprise was not successful, and the rest of his theatrical career was divided between management and acting in the same city. He retired finally from the stage, 18 November 1846, on the occasion of a benefit at the Walnut Street Theatre. For an account of his career, and much information regarding the American stage, see his Personal Recollections of the Stage (Philadelphia, 1855).  Wood is interred at Laurel Hill Cemetery, Section L, Plot 129, Philadelphia.

Notes

References

 

1779 births
1861 deaths
American theatre managers and producers
19th-century American male actors
American male stage actors
19th-century theatre managers